"Summer Summer" is a 1993 song by German Eurodance group Loft, released as their debut single. In 1994, it was included on their first album, Wake the World. Written by Nosie Katzmann and Attack II (Michael Eisele), it features vocals by singer Gina Mohammed. Becoming a major hit in Europe, the song peaked at number seven in Finland, number ten in Germany and number 15 in Denmark. Additionally, it was a Top 30 hit in Austria and a Top 40 hit in Switzerland. On the Eurochart Hot 100, it reached number 50 in September 1993. Outside Europe, it was a Top 30 hit also in Australia. A colorful music video was made to accompany it. In 2003, a new version of the song was released, titled "Summer Summer (Recall)".

Track listing

Charts

References

 

1993 debut singles
1993 songs
Eurodance songs
Reggae fusion songs
Songs written by Nosie Katzmann
English-language German songs
RCA Records singles